Charalampos Charalampous (born 4 April 2002) is a Cypriot footballer who plays as a midfielder for Omonia and the Cyprus national team.

Career

Club 
Having come through PAOK's academy, Charalampous signed his first contract as a professional footballer in 2018, with Cypriot First Division club Omonia. Having just turned 17, he made his first team debut on 14 April 2019, coming on as a substitute in a league game against Apollon Limassol.

On 25 May 2022, Charalampous scored the decisive penalty to win the 2021–22 Cypriot Cup for Omonia. He scored his first goal for the club on 18 August 2022 against Gent, in the Europa League Playoffs. On November 14, 2022, he renewed his contract with Omonia until 2026.

International 
Charalampous made his national team debut on 24 September 2022, coming on as a substitute in a 1–0 win against Greece, in the UEFA Nations League. He scored his first goal with Cyprus on 20 November 2022 in a friendly match that was won 3-2 against Israel.

Personal life
Charalampous is the nephew of former Cyprus football player Lefteris Kontolefteros.

International goals

Career Statistics

Club

International

Honours
Omonia
 Cypriot First Division: 2020–21
 Cypriot Cup: 2021–22
 Cypriot Super Cup: 2021

References

External links 
 
Charalampos Charalampous at Footballdatabase
 Charalampos Charalampous at Omonia

2002 births
Living people
Cypriot footballers
Cyprus international footballers
AC Omonia players
Association football midfielders